Zayko is a surname. Notable people with the surname include:

Dmytro Zayko (born 1985), Ukrainian footballer
Leonid Zayko (born 1948), Russian volleyball player
 (1940–2014), Russian journalist